There have been two baronetcies created for persons with the surname Owen, one in the Baronetage of England and one in the Baronetage of the United Kingdom.

The Owen Baronetcy, of Orielton in the County of Pembroke, was created in the Baronetage of England on 11 August 1641 for Hugh Owen, Member of Parliament for Pembroke, Haverfordwest and Pembrokeshire. The second, third and fourth Baronets all represented Pembroke and Pembrokeshire in the House of Commons and the latter two also served as Lord-Lieutenant of Pembrokeshire. The fifth Baronet sat for Pembrokeshire and was Lord-Lieutenant of Pembrokeshire while the sixth Baronet represented Pembroke in Parliament. The eighth Baronet assumed the additional surname of Barlow. The title became extinct on his death in 1851.

The Owen Baronetcy, of Orielton in the County of Pembroke, was created in the Baronetage of the United Kingdom on 12 January 1813 for John Owen, Member of Parliament for Pembroke and Lord-Lieutenant of Pembrokeshire. Born John Lord, he was the son of Joseph Lord and his wife Corbetta, daughter of Lieutenant-General John Owen, second son of the third Baronet of the first creation, and assumed the surname of Owen in lieu of his patronymic in 1809 on inheriting the estates of the sixth Baronet of the first creation. The second Baronet represented Pembroke in the House of Commons as a Liberal. The title became extinct on the death of the fifth Baronet in 2002.

Owen baronets, of Orielton (1641)
Sir Hugh Owen, 1st Baronet (died 1670)
Sir Hugh Owen, 2nd Baronet (–1699)
Sir Arthur Owen, 3rd Baronet (c. 1674–1753)
Sir William Owen, 4th Baronet (c. 1697–1781)
Sir Hugh Owen, 5th Baronet (died 1786)
Sir Hugh Owen, 6th Baronet (1782–1809)
Sir Arthur Owen, 7th Baronet (c. 1740–1817)
Sir William Owen-Barlow, 8th Baronet (1775–1851)

Owen baronets, of Orielton (1813)
Sir John Lord Owen, 1st Baronet (1776–1861)
Sir Hugh Owen Owen, 2nd Baronet (1803–1891)
Sir Hugh Charles Owen, 3rd Baronet (1826–1909)
Sir John Arthur Owen, 4th Baronet (1892–1973)
Sir Hugh Bernard Pilkington Owen, 5th Baronet (1915–2002)

Notes

References

Brief history of the Owen family

Extinct baronetcies in the Baronetage of England
Extinct baronetcies in the Baronetage of the United Kingdom